.uy is the Internet country code top-level domain (ccTLD) for Uruguay. Domain names can be registered at second-level or at third-level. , second level .uy registrations are possible.

Second-level domains
 .com.uy: for commercial companies (a local billing contact is required for foreign registrants).
 .edu.uy: for local educational entities.
 .gub.uy: for local governmental entities.
 .net.uy: for local Internet service providers.
 .mil.uy: for the Armed Forces of Uruguay.
 .org.uy: for non-profit organisations.

Management 
The Servicio Central de Informática (SeCIU, Central Computing Service) of the University of the Republic is the responsible authority to manage and register domains under .uy and its subdomains since April 1990, delegated by IANA through InterNIC. The domains under .com.uy are managed and registered by Antel via its website dominiosuy (nic.com.uy) instead. Domains directly under .uy can be registered directly at SeCIU or after the registrar entities it authorized, being Antel and other private companies.

References

External links
 IANA .uy whois information
 Registration website beneath other .uy second-level domains
 Interview with the technical responsible for .uy domains (spanish)

Internet in Uruguay
Country code top-level domains
Telecommunications in Uruguay

sv:Toppdomän#U